Dobârlău is a commune in Covasna County, Transylvania, Romania. It is composed of four villages: Dobârlău, Lunca Mărcușului (Bélmező), Mărcuș (Márkos) and Valea Dobârlăului (Dobollópatak). Ethnic Romanians represent the majority of the population.

References

Communes in Covasna County
Localities in Transylvania